La Belle que voilà (English title: Here Is the Beauty) is a 1950 French drama film directed by Jean-Paul Le Chanois who co-wrote screenplay with  Françoise Giroud, based on the novel Die Karriere der Doris Hart by Vicki Baum. The film stars by Michèle Morgan and Henri Vidal.

It depicts the annoyed love between a sculptor and a dancer.

Cast
Michèle Morgan : Jeanne Morel
Henri Vidal : Pierre Leroux 
ppHenri Arius[[ : Tordo, le patron de l'hôtel 
Jean Debucourt : M. de la Brunerie 
Édouard Delmont : Un gardien de prison 
Jean d'Yd : Ceccati 
Marcelle Géniat : Varbara Ostovska 
Bernard Lancret : Edmond Reybaud de la Brunerie 
Léo Lapara : Le chirurgien 
Gérard Oury : Bruno 
Jean Pâqui : Renaud, l'ingénieur 
Ludmilla Tchérina : Mireille Oslava 
Jean Témerson : Théophile 
Harriet Toby : Tania

External links

La Belle que voilà at AlloCiné 
La Belle que voilà at DvdToile

1950 films
Films directed by Jean-Paul Le Chanois
Films based on Austrian novels
Films about fictional painters
Films about ballet
French drama films
1950 drama films
French black-and-white films
Films scored by Joseph Kosma
Films about sculptors
1950s French films